Sophie Anna Magdalena Bevan  (born 1983) is a British soprano appearing in concerts, recitals, and opera.

Early life

Bevan was born in London. She graduated from the Benjamin Britten International Opera School where she studied as a Karaviotis Scholar with Lillian Watson and was awarded the Queen Mother Rose Bowl for excelling in music.

Career

Her concert repertoire ranges from Handel to James Macmillan and she has worked with conductors that include Sir Antonio Pappano, Edward Gardner, Laurence Cummings, Harry Bicket, Sir Neville Marriner, Phillipe Herreweghe, Sir Mark Elder, Ryan Wigglesworth, Daniel Harding and Sir Charles Mackerras.   Already highly accomplished on the operatic stage, her engagements include her first Sophie in Der Rosenkavalier for English National Opera; the title role in The Cunning Little Vixen for Welsh National Opera; her first Susana Le Nozze di Figaro for Garsington Opera; Michal Saul for Glyndebourne Festival Opera; and Waldvogel Siegfried, Pamina and Ilia for the Royal Opera House, Covent Garden. Engagements this season and beyond include Susana and Antigone Oedipe at Covent Garden; concerts with the Sao Paulo State Symphony, CBSO, and recitals at the Wigmore Hall; Pamina for the Teatro Real, Madrid; her debut at the Salzburg Festival as Beatrice in the world première of Thomas Adès’ The Exterminating Angel; and her debut at the Metropolitan Opera, New York.

Sophie is also the recipient of the 2010 Critics’ Circle award for Exceptional Young Talent, The Times Breakthrough Award at the 2012 South Bank Sky Arts Awards and the Young Singer award at the 2013 inaugural International Opera Awards.

Bevan was appointed Member of the Order of the British Empire (MBE) in the 2019 Birthday Honours for services to music.

Operatic repertoire 
Gluck: La clemenza di Tito (Publio)
Handel: Riccardo I (Costanza)
Monteverdi: L'Incoronazione di Poppea (Poppea/Amor)
Mozart: Le nozze di Figaro (Susanna/Barbarina); Don Giovanni (Zerlina); Così fan tutte (Despina); Die Schuldigkeit des ersten Gebots (Worldly Spirit)
Vivaldi: L'Incoronazione di Dario (Alinda)

Discography 
Perfido! (with Ian Page (conductor) and The Mozartists), Signum Records (2017)
Max Reger: Songs (with Malcolm Martineau (Hyperion Records,  CDA68057, 2016)
Paul Carr: Requiem For An Angel (with Mark Stone - baritone, Chorus Angelorum, the Bath Philharmonia, Gavin Carr - conductor), Stone Records (2010)
Hail Windsor, Crown'd with lofty towers - with Café Mozart (Derek McCulloch), DanubiaDiscs CM003, 2005
Haydn & the Earl of Abingdon - with Café Mozart (Derek McCulloch), Naxos 8.570525, 2007
Begone dull care! Music from Jane Austen's library - with Box&Fir Co (Jenny Thomas), DanubiaDiscs DD006, 2009

References

Other sources

External links
Management website
English National Opera website
Garsington Opera website
Handel's Messiah with Vignette Arts
Sophie Bevan sings "I know that my Redeemer liveth" to the Messiah Community Ensemble for the English National Opera's production of Handel's Messiah, directed by Deborah Warner
Hyperion Records website

1983 births
Living people
English operatic sopranos
British sopranos
Singers from London
21st-century British women opera singers
Members of the Order of the British Empire